Lombadan-e Sheykh Ahmad (also Romanized as Lombadān-e Sheykh Aḩmad) is a village in Howmeh Rural District, in the Central District of Deyr County, Bushehr Province, Iran. At the 2006 census, its population was 11, in 4 families.

References 

Populated places in Deyr County